Kornel Osyra (born 7 February 1993) is a Polish professional footballer who plays as a defender for Hebar Pazardzhik.

References

External links
 
 

1993 births
Living people
People from Brzeg Dolny
Association football defenders
Polish footballers
Poland youth international footballers
Ekstraklasa players
I liga players
II liga players
Zagłębie Lubin players
Gryf Wejherowo players
Piast Gliwice players
Bruk-Bet Termalica Nieciecza players
Miedź Legnica players
Podbeskidzie Bielsko-Biała players
Sandecja Nowy Sącz players
FC Hebar Pazardzhik players
Polish expatriate footballers
Expatriate footballers in Bulgaria
Polish expatriate sportspeople in Bulgaria
Sportspeople from Lower Silesian Voivodeship